The siege of Santarém, lasted from June 1184 to July 1184. In the spring of 1184, Abu Yaqub Yusuf assembled an army, crossed the straits of Gibraltar and marched to Seville. From there he marched towards Badajoz and headed west to besiege Santarém, Portugal, which was defended by Afonso I of Portugal. Upon hearing of Abu Yusuf's attack, Ferdinand II of León marched his troops to Santarém to support his father-in-law, Afonso I.

Death of Yusuf
Abu Yusuf, believing he had sufficient troops to maintain the siege, sent orders for part of his army to march to Lisbon and lay siege to that city too. The orders were misinterpreted and his army, seeing large contingents of men leaving the battle, became confused and started to retreat. Abu Yusuf, in an attempt to rally his troops, was wounded by a crossbow bolt and died on 29 July 1184.

Papal recognition
The victory at Santarém was a major achievement for Afonso I. Pope Alexander III formally recognized him as rex Portugalensium.

References

Battles of the Reconquista
Santarém
1184 in Europe
12th century in Portugal
Santarém
Santarém
Santarem 1184
12th century in the Kingdom of León
12th century in Al-Andalus